Novotroitske is the name of several localities in Ukraine.

 Novotroitske, Donetsk Oblast, an urban-type settlement in Donetsk Oblast, Ukraine
 Novotroitske, Kherson Oblast, an urban-type settlement in Kherson Oblast, Ukraine
 Novotroitske, Orikhiv Raion, a village in Orikhiv Raion, Zaporizhia Oblast

See also
 Novotroitskoye